Hernando Tejada Sáenz (February 1, 1924 in Pereira, Colombia – June 1, 1998 in Cali, Colombia), popularly known as Tejadita, was a Colombian painter and sculptor. His most well-known sculpture, El Gato del Río, is a famous landmark of Cali, Colombia.

Women and cats were common themes in his works. In his later years, another theme was the inclusion of mangroves and their surrounding environment.

His nickname of tejadita alludes to his short stature (1.50 meters tall).

Biography

His early childhood life was in Manizales, along with his parents, José Tejada and Ismenia Sáenz, four brothers, and two sisters, including Lucy Tejada who was also an accomplished artist, and less recognized, his sister Teresita Tejada. In 1937 his family moved to the city of Cali where he studied at the Departmental Institute of Fine Arts with its founder and Professor Jesús María Espinosa and completed his studies at the National School of Fine Arts in Bogotá (today a part of the National University of Colombia).

Besides traditional painting, Tejada often worked with wood. He created a series of "furniture-piece" women, such as Teresa la mujer mesa ("Teresa the woman table") in 1969. For one of his final wooden series, he sculpted mangroves and animals together, including snakes, monkeys, and pelicans. His mangrove series was exhibited at the 1998 Lisbon World Exposition in Portugal.

His last bronze sculpture was El Gato del Río, also known as El Gato de Tejada ("Tejada's Cat"). The sculpture is over three meters tall and three tons. It is located on the riverside of the Cali River and was gifted by Tejada to the city.

He died in Cali in 1998 after 43 days of hospitalization. After his death, his family sought to donate more than 3,000 paintings and 70 large works of art by the artist to art or cultural institutions in Cali. However, at the time of his death there was no serious interest in receiving his family's donation. In 2006, the Medellín Museum of Modern Art accepted the donation, including the artist's former house.

References

External links
 Official website

1924 births
1998 deaths
People from Pereira, Colombia
Naïve art
20th-century Colombian painters
20th-century Colombian male artists
Sibling artists
Colombian male painters